Night Is the New Day is Katatonia's eighth full-length album. It was released 2 November 2009, in Europe and 10 November 2009, in North America through Peaceville Records. Thirteen tracks were recorded, eleven of which made it onto the record. The band describes the material as "Our most varied, diverse and possibly strongest shit all together on one and the same album". "Idle Blood" had the working title "Kozelek", named after Mark Kozelek, a member of Red House Painters, which is one of Katatonia's influences. This is the last Katatonia release with the Norrman brothers.

Release and reception

Night Is the New Day sold more than 2,000 copies in the United States in its first week of release. "Day and Then the Shade" was the first single, released in late 2009. The promotional video for this song was directed by Lasse Hoile.

Musical style
Night Is the New Day shows Katatonia expanding their music palette. The album shows a slightly more progressive sound than The Great Cold Distance, yet retains the heaviness and morose atmosphere, with electronics and synths playing an important role. The big, heavy parts are interspersed with quiet, somber electronics, and acoustic guitars. Each song transforms frequently, changing tempo, intensity and texture. "Forsaker" starts aggressively but soon the down-tuned metal chords shift to chiming darkwave strains. "The Longest Year" intertwines synth and metal passages, while the acoustic style of "Idle Blood" is comparable to Opeth and Porcupine Tree. "Nephilim" brings together a dissonant minor-chord chorus with a plodding beat and an oppressive atmosphere. The single "Day and Then the Shade" is both brooding and heavy, as well as atmospheric and progressive.

Critical reception
The album was generally well received by critics. The album was deemed the second best metal album of 2009 by Popmatters.

Track listing
All lyrics by Jonas Renkse except where noted, all music by Renkse, except where noted. Writing credits taken from ASCAP.

Chart positions

Credits

Katatonia
Jonas Renkse – lead vocals; production
Anders Nyström – lead guitar; production
Fredrik Norrman – rhythm guitar
Mattias Norrman – bass guitar
Daniel Liljekvist – drums

Additional personnel
Krister Linder – co-vocals on "Departer"
Frank Default – keyboards, additional strings and additional percussion
David Castillo – production
Travis Smith – artwork, design
Linda Åkerberg	– photography

References

External links

Frank Default website

2009 albums
Katatonia albums
Albums with cover art by Travis Smith (artist)
Peaceville Records albums